The 2017 IndyCar Grand Prix at The Glen was the 16th and penultimate round of the 2017 Verizon IndyCar Series. The race was on September 3, 2017. The pole position was won by Alexander Rossi, the first of his career. Rossi would go on to convert the pole into a win, the second of his career and first on a road course. As of 2022, this is the final IndyCar race at Watkins Glen, as well as the final win for Bryan Herta Autosport as Rossi would move to the #27 car at Andretti Autosport for the 2018 season.

References

IndyCar Grand Prix at The Glen
IndyCar Grand Prix at The Glen
2017 IndyCar Grand Prix at The Glen
IndyCar Grand Prix at The Glen